The Asia/Oceania Zone was one of the three zones of the regional Davis Cup competition in 1997.

In the Asia/Oceania Zone there were four different tiers, called groups, in which teams competed against each other to advance to the upper tier. Winners in Group I advanced to the World Group Qualifying Round, along with losing teams from the World Group first round. Teams who lost their respective ties competed in the relegation play-offs, with winning teams remaining in Group I, whereas teams who lost their play-offs were relegated to the Asia/Oceania Zone Group II in 1998.

Participating nations

Draw

 relegated to Group II in 1998.
 and  advance to World Group Qualifying Round.

First round

Philippines vs. Indonesia

China vs. Uzbekistan

South Korea vs. Japan

Second round

Indonesia vs. New Zealand

China vs. South Korea

First round relegation play-offs

Uzbekistan vs. Japan

Second round relegation play-offs

Uzbekistan vs. Philippines

References

External links
Davis Cup official website

Davis Cup Asia/Oceania Zone
Asia Oceania Zone Group I